The 1891 Case football team was an American football team that represented the Case School of Applied Science in Cleveland, Ohio, now a part of Case Western Reserve University. The season was the team's first.  Playing as an independent during the 1891 college football season, the team compiled a 1–2 record.

Schedule

References

Case
Case Western Reserve Spartans football seasons
Case football